Severn is a census-designated place (CDP) in Anne Arundel County, Maryland, United States. As of the 2020 U.S. census, the population of Severn is 57,118, a 22.6% increase from 44,231 according to the 2010 census. The zip code is 21144.

Geography
Severn is located at  (39.132841, −76.694002) in northwestern Anne Arundel County. It is bordered by Hanover to the north, Glen Burnie to the east, Odenton and Millersville to the south, and Fort George G. Meade to the west. The Baltimore–Washington Parkway (Maryland Route 295) forms the northwestern edge of the CDP, Maryland Route 176 (Dorsey Road) forms the northern edge, and Interstate 97 forms the eastern edge. Part of the southern boundary of the CDP is formed by the non-tidal portion of the Severn River. The Maryland Route 100 freeway runs through the northern part of the CDP, connecting the B-W Parkway and I-97.

Demographics

At the 2000 census, there were 35,076 people, 12,003 households, and 9,506 families living in the CDP. The racial makeup of the CDP was 56.25% white, 34.56% black, 0.42% Native American, 4.29% Asian, 0.10% Pacific Islander, 1.36% from other races, and 3.02% from two or more races. Hispanic or Latino of any race were 3.96%.

Of the 12,003 households, 43.4% had children under the age of 18 living with them, 59.8% were married couples living together, 14.7% had a female householder with no husband present, and 20.8% were non-families. 15.3% of households were one person, and 2.5% were one person aged 65 or older. The average household size was 2.91, and the average family size was 3.24.

The age distribution was 30.3% under the age of 18, 7.8% from 18 to 24, 35.7% from 25 to 44, 21.1% from 45 to 64, and 5.2% 65 or older. The median age was 33 years. For every 100 females, there were 94.7 males. For every 100 females age 18 and over, there were 91.9 males.

The median household income was $66,204 and the median family income  was $68,424 (these figures had risen to $84,864 and $99,583 respectively as of a 2007 estimate). Males had a median income of $42,933 versus $31,751 for females. The per capita income for the CDP was $24,640. About 5.4% of families and 6.5% of the population were below the poverty line, including 10.7% of those under age 18 and 7.1% of those age 65 or over.

Education

Public schools
Students may attend public schools within the Anne Arundel County Public Schools district.
 Arundel Middle School – 6th through 8th grade
 Arundel High School – 9th through 12th grade
 Center of Applied Technology North – vocational education classes for 9th through 12th grade
 Severn Elementary School – kindergarten through 5th grade
 Ridgeway Elementary School – kindergarten through 5th grade
 Van Bokkelen Elementary School – pre-kindergarten through 5th grade
 Quarterfield Elementary School – pre-kindergarten through 5th grade
 Meade Heights Elementary School – kindergarten through 5th grade
 Meade Senior High School – 9th through 12th grade
 Corkran Middle School – 6th through 8th grade
 Glen Burnie High School – 9th through 12th grade
 Old Mill Middle School South and North – 6th through 8th grade
 Old Mill High School – 9th through 12th grade

Private schools 
 Annapolis Area Christian School
 Archbishop Spalding High School

Notable residents 
 Jessica Benson, singer
 The Braxtons (Toni, Traci, Towanda, Trina and Tamar, along with their brother Michael), singers and stars of Braxton Family Values
 Steve Dannenmann, accountant who gained fame as the 2005 World Series of Poker runner-up
 A. J. Francis, former NFL defense tackle
 Marina Harrison, Miss Maryland 2003 and Miss Maryland USA 2005
 C. Edward Middlebrooks, politician
 Erin O'Donnell, singer
 Victor Sulin, politician

References

 
Census-designated places in Maryland
Census-designated places in Anne Arundel County, Maryland